Mehboob ki Mehendi is a place in Hyderabad, Telangana, India. It was a mujra joint, a time honoured tradition of Music and Dance, during the reign of the Nizams in Hyderabad State.

History
It got its name after a Chilla of Mahboob Subhani, where the mujras were popular. Noted courtesan, Mah Laqa Bai, was present here. The Courtesans and other performing artistes held a respectable position in Hyderabad before Aurangzeb's reign.

Present day
In the 1980s it became the red light area. But in 1996, the area was evacuated. Prominent NGO, Prajwala is working to rehabilitate the children.

References

External links
 The Courtesans of Hyderabad & Mehboob Ki Mehendi
 The Elite Performer

Hyderabad State
Neighbourhoods in Hyderabad, India
Culture of Hyderabad, India